A referendum on becoming a republic was held in the Gambia on 24 November 1965. If the referendum had passed, the post of president would have replaced Elizabeth II as head of state, and thus eliminated the post of Governor-General.

There were 154,626 registered voters for the referendum, with 93,484 valid votes cast. 65.85% of voters voted for the proposal, but failed to reach the two-thirds support required for the proposal to be accepted.

A second referendum was held in 1970, which resulted in a successful "yes" vote. Prime Minister Dawda Jawara was elected president by the parliament, replacing Elizabeth II (represented by Farimang Mamadi Singateh) as head of state on 24 April 1970.

Result

References

1965 referendums
1965 in the Gambia
1965
Republicanism in the Gambia
The Gambia and the Commonwealth of Nations
Constitutional referendums
Monarchy referendums
November 1965 events in Africa